Jean-Gabriel Domergue (4 March 1889 – 16 November 1962) was a French painter specialising in portraits of Parisian women.

Biography 
Domergue was born in Bordeaux and studied at the École nationale supérieure des Beaux-Arts. In 1911, he was a winner of the Prix de Rome. From the 1920s onward he concentrated on portraits, and claimed to be "the inventor of the pin-up". He also designed clothes for the couturier Paul Poiret. From 1955 until 1962 he was the curator of the Musée Jacquemart-André, organising exhibitions of the works of Van Gogh, Toulouse-Lautrec, Goya and others. 
Domergue was appointed a Chevalier of the Légion d'honneur.
He died 16 November 1962 on a Paris sidewalk.

Awards 
 
 Knight of the Legion of Honour
 Fellow of the Academy of Fine Arts.

Jury 
Jean-Gabriel Domergue was a member of the jury for Miss France 1938.

See also
 Villa Domergue
 
 Gazette du Bon Ton

References

External links 
 Jean Gabriel Domergue 's archives
 Images from "La Parisienne, 1955"

1889 births
1962 deaths
20th-century French painters
20th-century French male artists
French male painters
Chevaliers of the Légion d'honneur
École des Beaux-Arts alumni
Members of the Académie des beaux-arts